The Life and Times of Judge Roy Bean is a 1972 American Western comedy film written by John Milius, directed by John Huston, and starring Paul Newman. It was loosely based on the life and times of Judge Roy Bean.

Plot
An outlaw, Roy Bean, rides into a West Texas border town called Vinegaroon by himself. The customers in the saloon beat him, rob him, toss a noose around him, and let his horse drag him off.

A young woman named Maria Elena finds and helps him. Bean promptly returns to town and shoots all those who did him wrong. With no law and order, he appoints himself judge and "the law west of the Pecos" and becomes the townspeople's patron. A traveling preacher, LaSalle, buries the dead.

Bean renames the saloon The Jersey Lilly, and hangs a portrait of a woman he worships, but has never met, Lillie Langtry, a noted actress and singer of the 1890s. Maria Elena is given a place to live and fine clothes ordered from a Sears Roebuck catalog. When a band of thieves comes to town (Big Bart Jackson and gang members Nick the Grub, Fermel Parlee, Tector Crites, and Whorehouse Lucky Jim), rather than oppose them, Bean swears them in as lawmen. The new marshals round up other outlaws, then claim their goods after Bean sentences them to hang. Prostitutes are sentenced to remain in town and keep the marshals company.

Dispensing his own kind of frontier justice, Bean lets the marshals hang a murderer named Sam Dodd, and share his money. When a drunk shoots up a saloon, Bean does not mind, but when Lillie's portrait is struck by a bullet, the fellow is shot dead on the spot. Bean then goes through the dead drunk's pockets. Finding money, he then fines the dead drunk for discharging a firearm in a public place and pockets the money.

Bean proceeds to encounter many odd characters passing through his town. First a mountain man called Grizzly Adams gives Bean a bear (named Zachary Taylor after the 12th president of the United States, but later renamed the Watch Bear) as a pet. Later a madman, Bad Bob, comes to town and proceeds to raise hell, kill his own horse and challenge Bean to a showdown. Bean shoots him in the back. When a lawyer named Frank Gass shows up claiming the saloon is rightfully his, Bean puts him in a cage with the bear.

Bean goes to San Antonio, Texas alone to see Jersey Lilly, leaving a pregnant Maria Elena behind and promising her a music box that plays "The Yellow Rose of Texas". In his absence, Gass and the prostitutes conspire to seize control of the town from the judge's hard rule. A dapper Bean tries to see Lillie Langtry's show, but it is sold out. He is deceived by men who knock him cold and steal his money.

Upon his return, Bean finds that Maria Elena is dying following a difficult childbirth. He names the baby Rose after the music box's song. He also plans to hang the doctor, but Gass, who has been elected mayor, overrules him. Bean is sorrowful about losing Maria Elena and rides away. Gass brings in hired guns to get rid of Bean's marshals.

Years go by. Oil rigs have been built around the prospering town. Automobiles are seen everywhere. A grown-up Rose is surprised one day to look up and find Bean has returned. A shootout follows. Bean, on horseback, chases Gass into a burning building, declaring "For Texas, and Miss Lilly!".

Some time later, a train pauses by the town. Out steps Lillie Langtry. She is told the story of Judge Roy Bean and his feelings toward her by Tector, the caretaker of the saloon, now turned into a museum. She concludes that he must have been quite a character.

Cast

 Paul Newman as Judge Roy Bean
 Jacqueline Bisset as Rose Bean
 Tab Hunter as Sam Dodd
 John Huston as Grizzly Adams
 Stacy Keach as Bad Bob
 Roddy McDowall as Frank Gass
 Anthony Perkins as Reverend LaSalle
 Anthony Zerbe as Hustler, at the opera house
 Ava Gardner as Lillie Langtry
 Victoria Principal as Maria Elena
 Ned Beatty as Tector Crites
 Jim Burk as Big Bart Jackson
 Matt Clark as Nick the Grub
 Billy Pearson as Stationmaster
 Bill McKinney as Fermel Parlee
 Steve Kanaly as Whorehouse Lucky Jim
 Michael Sarrazin as Rose's husband

Additional notable appearances include Mark Headley as Billy the Kid, Jack Colvin as a Pimp, Dick Farnsworth, Roy Jenson, and Fred Krone as Outlaws, Howard Morton as a Photographist, and Don Starr as the Opera House Manager. Stuntman Stan Barrett appears as a Killer while stuntwoman Jeannie Epper makes an appearance as a Whore. The black bear Bruno also appears as Zachary Taylor/Watch Bear.

Production
The film was based on an original script by John Milius, who hoped to direct with Warren Oates in the lead. "I wanted to make it very cheap," he said. "Shoot in Spain. In some crummy little town, a Sergio Leone leftover and have Warren be the Judge."

The script was sent to Lee Marvin who was making Pocket Money with Paul Newman; Newman read the script and became enthusiastic about starring. The producers were not keen on Milius directing and paid a record price to own the script outright – $300,000.

Milius later said he liked John Huston but thought he completely ruined the movie. He was angry at the casting of "cutesy-pie" Paul Newman and felt Warren Oates would have been more suitable.

Milius later elaborated:
Judge Roy Bean has been turned into a Beverly Hills western. Roy Bean is an obsessed man. He's like Lawrence of Arabia. He sits out there in the desert and he's got this great vision of law and order and civilization and he kills people and does anything in the name of progress. I love those kind of people! That's the kind of people who built this country! That's the American spirit! And they say, 'What you've created is a reprehensible man. We've got to make him much more cute.' So they changed it from a Western about royalty and greed and power to a western where Andy Williams sings a song in the middle of the movie and the judge and his girl and a pet bear go off on a picnic. It's incredible. He goes on a picnic and sits on a teeter-totter. It's a movie about Beverly Hills people. About John Foreman and John Huston and Paul Newman.

Milius also said Huston "would explain what he was doing to me all the time. We had a strange relationship. He tortured me constantly, changing things and doing scenes, I thought, deliberately wrong. At the same time, he would explain his options and why he made the decision he made, right or wrong; or the different ways he could have done it. I watched the way an atmosphere was created on the set, watched the way he would respond to an actor resisting him and the way he dealt with an actor going along with him too easily. How he would deal with bad actors. I remember one time when he had someone he said was the worst he'd ever had, and I asked him, what do you do? And he said ‘Not a damn thing, I have no idea.’ He just went back to his trailer."

Milius said there "was a terrific amount of humor in the original screenplay. More humor than was in this one (the movie). But it still had a feel that was closer to say a Sergio Leone movie... The Good, the Bad and the Ugly would probably be a good example."

Milius claimed the experience prompted him to go into directing "out of self defence and a desire to control".

Watch Bear was played by Bruno, an American black bear that had played the lead in the 1967–1969 TV series Gentle Ben. Paul Newman thought that Bruno stole every scene in which they appeared together, an opinion shared by some reviewers.

"My God is Paul Newman a good actor," said John Huston. "He's just marvelous in this picture. He's never done anything quite like this and yet he's caught something unique and original. The picture definitely says something about a spirit of the past. There's something uniquely American about the judge."

During shooting, Anthony Perkins had an affair with Victoria Principal, who was making her film debut. He later married Berry Berenson.

"I think we've got a hell of a picture," said John Huston. "I think it will be very popular. Of course I've been wrong before, but there's a grand sort of thing about it. The wind blows through it. The story is a complete departure from reality, a pure fantasy."

The film was budgeted at $3 million, but costs increased due to insertion of a final sequence not in the original script and extensive post-production editing.

Reception
The film earned estimated North American rentals of $7 million in 1973.

Roger Ebert gave the film two-and-a-half stars out of four and wrote that it "doesn't have much flow and keeps stopping and starting." Vincent Canby of The New York Times called the film "so entertaining and so vigorously performed, especially by Newman in the title role, that its pretensions become part of its robust, knock-about style." Variety wrote "The two-hour running time is not fleshed out with anything more than scenic vignettes, sometime attempting to recreate the success of Butch Cassidy and the Sundance Kid, with an Alan and Marilyn Bergman-lyricked tune and Maurice Jarre's music, sometimes attempting honest spoofing of western, and sometimes trying to play the story historically straight. The overkill and the undertone do it in." Gene Siskel of the Chicago Tribune gave the film two stars out of four and wrote "Not the 'bawdy' gags, nor the 'Marmalade, Molasses and Honey' musical interlude sung by Andy Williams, can hide the essential flaw in Roy Bean: He is a blind, egotistical jerk who gets off by hanging people." Kevin Thomas of the Los Angeles Times wrote, "Arguably overlong, arguably self-indulgent on occasion, The Life and Times of Judge Roy Bean is nonetheless happily as intent upon being fun as it is in being significant. As Bean, Newman may not seem quite dumb enough but is genuinely moving and has great authority. Surely his performance here is a high point in a notable career." Gary Arnold of The Washington Post declared the film "a big name bummer. I spent the better part of an exceedingly slow two hours fighting recurrent attacks of drowsiness...The episodic structure is undermined by too many episodes that depend on crude jokes, dumb wheezes and gratuitous killing. As the scenes and the would-be 'colorful' characters flop and repeat themselves, one's interest begins to evaporate." Clyde Jeavons of The Monthly Film Bulletin wrote "Now and again, thanks to the choice of an episodic style and the use of an engaging crop of guest stars in cameo roles, there are glimpses of what might have been; moments when the film looks as if it might take off like Butch Cassidy or say something meaningful like Little Big Man...But these are small oases in a large desert, and no matter how dismissive John Huston may choose to be about his film, it has the air of an elaborate mistake—overblown, tedious and over-emphatic."

The film holds a score of 89% on Rotten Tomatoes, based on 9 reviews.

Awards and nominations

Legacy
The music cue from the film, entitled Miss Lily Langtry and composed by Maurice Jarre, appears in the 2019 movie Once Upon a Time in Hollywood, written and directed by Quentin Tarantino and is included on the film's soundtrack.

See also
 List of American films of 1972

References

External links 
 
 
 
 

1972 films
1972 Western (genre) films
American Western (genre) films
Biographical films about people of the American Old West
Cultural depictions of Billy the Kid
Cultural depictions of Roy Bean
1970s English-language films
Films about capital punishment
Films directed by John Huston
Films produced by John Foreman (producer)
Films scored by Maurice Jarre
Films set in Texas
Films set in the 1890s
Films with screenplays by John Milius
First Artists films
Revisionist Western (genre) films
1970s American films